Jhake Angelo Cunanan Vargas (born July 9, 1992), better known as Jake Vargas, is a Filipino actor. He is known for his television roles in various hit GMA Network dramas such as Stairway to Heaven, Reel Love Presents Tween Hearts, Captain Barbell, Alice Bungisngis and Her Wonder Walis, Strawberry Lane, Buena Familia, and Ika-5 Utos. He is best known for his role as Chito Manaloto in the sitcom, Pepito Manaloto.

Vargas also starred in films, including Tween Academy: Class of 2012, My Kontrabida Girl, and Asintado. For his performance in Asintado, he won the rising star award at the WorldFest-Houston International Film Festival and was nominated for Best Actor at the 2015 FAMAS Awards, and Movie Supporting Actor of the Year at the 2015 PMPC Star Awards for Movies.

Filmography

Film

Television

Discography

Studio album

Awards and nominations

References

External links

Sparkle GMA Artist Center profile

1992 births
Living people
Filipino male television actors
Filipino male child actors
21st-century Filipino male singers
People from Olongapo
Male actors from Zambales
GMA Network personalities
GMA Music artists
Filipino television variety show hosts